Odontolytes is a genus of aphodiine dung beetles in the family Scarabaeidae. There are about 19 described species in Odontolytes.

Species
These 19 species belong to the genus Odontolytes:

 Odontolytes andamanensis Koshantschikov, 1916
 Odontolytes angusticollis (Schmidt, 1909)
 Odontolytes capitosus (Harold, 1867)
 Odontolytes denominatus (Chevrolat, 1864)
 Odontolytes domingo (Stebnicka, 2002)
 Odontolytes guayara (Stebnicka, 2002)
 Odontolytes huebneri (Petrovitz, 1970)
 Odontolytes iquitosae (Stebnicka, 2002)
 Odontolytes landai (Balthasar, 1963)
 Odontolytes loretoensis (Stebnicka, 2002)
 Odontolytes minutus (Petrovitz, 1973)
 Odontolytes panamensis (Stebnicka, 2002)
 Odontolytes puyoensis (Stebnicka, 2002)
 Odontolytes rondoniae (Stebnicka, 2002)
 Odontolytes tectipennis (Stebnicka & Skelley, 2005)
 Odontolytes teutoniae (Stebnicka, 2002)
 Odontolytes transversaria (Schmidt, 1909)
 Odontolytes viejoae (Stebnicka & Skelley, 2005)
 Odontolytes waoraniae (Stebnicka & Skelley, 2005)

References

Further reading

 
 
 
 

Scarabaeidae
Articles created by Qbugbot